The 2020 Los Angeles County Board of Supervisors elections took place on March 3, 2020, with runoff elections held on November 3, 2020, to elect members of the Los Angeles County Board of Supervisors. Three of the five seats on the board were up for election.

With the election of Holly Mitchell in the second district, the board of supervisors consisted entirely of women for the first time in history.

Municipal elections in California are officially nonpartisan; candidates' party affiliations do not appear on the ballot.

District 2

The second supervisorial district is the smallest of the five, comprising mostly parts of the South Los Angeles and South Bay areas. It contains the cities of Inglewood, Compton, Carson, and Hawthorne. Incumbent supervisor Mark Ridley-Thomas was term-limited and could not seek re-election.

Candidates

Advanced to runoff
 Holly Mitchell (Democratic), state senator and former state assemblywoman
 Herb Wesson (Democratic), Los Angeles city councilor and former state assemblyman

Eliminated in primary
 Jake Jeong, attorney
 Jorge Nuno, candidate for Los Angeles City Council in 2017
 Jan Perry (Democratic), former Los Angeles city councilor
 Albert Robles (Democratic), mayor of Carson
 Rene Rigard

Results

District 4

The fourth supervisorial district contains most of the South Bay and Gateway Cities areas, as well as parts of the Harbor Region and San Gabriel Valley. It includes the cities of Long Beach, Torrance, Downey, Norwalk, Whittier, and Lakewood. Incumbent supervisor Janice Hahn was first elected in 2016 with 56.3% of the vote.

Candidates
 Janice Hahn (Democratic), incumbent supervisor
 Desiree Washington

Results

District 5

The fifth supervisorial district is the largest of the five, covering the entire northern half of the county including the Verdugo Mountains, the San Gabriel Mountains, the Antelope Valley, and portions of the San Gabriel Valley. It includes the cities of Santa Clarita, Glendale, Lancaster, Palmdale, Pasadena, Burbank, and Alhambra. Incumbent supervisor Kathryn Barger was first elected in a runoff election in 2016 with 57.9% of the vote.

Candidates
 Kathryn Barger (Republican), incumbent supervisor
 John Harabedian
 Darrell Park (Democratic), community activist and candidate for this district in 2016

Results

References

External links
Los Angeles County Department of Registrar-Recorder/County Clerk

Los Angeles County Board of Supervisors
2020
Los Angeles County